Fathimath Rauf (7 October 1959) is a Maldivian singer.

Early life and career
Fathimath Rauf was born and raised in the "Masodi family" where several local artists emerged as prominent singers. At the age of thirteen, as insisted by her father, Rauf performed a song on the stage which caught the attention of the audience. Music directors realized her potential and roped in to sing for their projects which enabled her to "rise to fame" during her career beginning. While working at Dhivehi Raajjeyge Adu, she joined the local band "Olympians" and became a prominent face in their stage shows. With the inauguration of National Centre for the Arts, she joined the centre and served for the government till her retirement in August 2017.

In 1983, the Government of Maldives honoured her with the National Award of Recognition, which makes her the third female singer to receive this honour. Besides, she was bestowed with the first Gaumee Film Award for Best Female Playback Singer for her rendition of the fast-paced song "Loabin Ujaalaa" from the film Dhon Manma (1992). Her high-pitched rendition of the song "Oagaaverivey Loabivaa" from the film Amaanaaiy (1998) remains as one of the most iconic songs she has recorded. After contributing to the soundtrack album of Zuleykha with the song "Heevey Ladhugannahen", her voice was not heard in any further film releases where she reasoned it as "making path for the upcoming talented singers". However, she has frequently collaborated with the Olympians band and participated in several stage performances and lent her voice for few studio albums released afterwards.

Discography

Feature film

Television

Non-film songs

Religious / Madhaha

Accolades

References 

Living people
People from Malé
1959 births
Maldivian playback singers